Kaare Støylen (3 October 1909 – 22 August 1989) was a Norwegian theologian and priest.  He served as the Bishop of the Diocese of Agder from 1957-1973.

Personal life
Kaare Støylen was born in Aker, Norway on 3 October 1909. He was the son of Bernt Støylen, the future Bishop of Kristiansand, and his wife Kamilla Karoline Heiberg.  In 1932, he married Agnes Louise Rosario Stray, however she died in 1943.  He then married Honoria Margrethe Faye in 1945.  Kaare Støylen died on 22 August 1989 in Bergen, Norway.

Education and career
Kaare Støylen went to the Kristiansand Cathedral School in 1927.  He went on to the University of Oslo, graduating in 1932 with a Cand.theol. degree.  Later in life, in 1957, he graduated from the same school with a doctor of theology degree.

Støylen spent many years serving the Norwegian Seamen's Church.  He first served as an assistant priest at the Seamen's Church in London from 1932 until 1935.  After that, he moved to Oslo to work in the administrative offices of the Seamen's Church from 1935 until 1940.  In 1940, he became an assistant priest at the Bergen Cathedral.  In 1946, he became a priest at the St. Jakob Church in Bergen.  He also worked for the congregation of people who were deaf that met Bergen. In 1955, he was appointed as the General Secretary of the Seamen's Church.  He held this post until 1958 when he was appointed to serve as Bishop of the Diocese of Agder, based at the Kristiansand Cathedral.  In 1973, after 15 years as bishop, he was appointed to be the new Bishop of the Diocese of Oslo. As bishop, he was given the honor of baptizing the future King of Norway, Crown Prince Haakon Magnus, in the Palace Chapel in Oslo in 1973.  He was decorated as Commander with Star of the Royal Norwegian Order of St. Olav in 1975.   He served as Bishop of Oslo until his retirement in 1977.

References

1909 births
1989 deaths
Writers from Oslo
Bishops of Oslo
Støylen
Norwegian non-fiction writers
Commanders of the Order of the Polar Star
20th-century Norwegian writers
20th-century non-fiction writers